John Michael Cooley (born September 14, 1966) is an American songwriter, singer, and guitarist from Tuscumbia, Alabama, near Muscle Shoals. He is a member of the band Drive-By Truckers.

Background

Cooley received his first guitar at age 8, spending time with a local bluegrass musician to pick up the instrument. In 1985, he formed the punk-influenced band Adam's House Cat with Patterson Hood. The band was chosen as a top ten Best Unsigned Band by a Musician contest in the late 1980s. After the end of Adam's House Cat, Cooley and Hood performed as a duo under the name "Virgil Kane." While living in Auburn, Alabama they started a new band, "Horsepussy," before splitting for a few years. It was during this split that Hood moved to Athens, Georgia and began forming what would become Drive-By Truckers with the intent of luring Cooley back into the fold.

With the Drive-by Truckers

Hood and Cooley formed Drive-By Truckers in 1996. Cooley contributed one song to their debut record Gangstabilly and three songs to the follow-up, Pizza Deliverance. Cooley wrote five songs for the breakout double album Southern Rock Opera, which received a four star rating from Rolling Stone Magazine. Cooley added four songs to the Truckers' next two records Decoration Day and The Dirty South, including his signature song "Carl Perkins' Cadillac". He wrote two songs for the follow-up A Blessing and a Curse and seven for Brighter Than Creation's Dark. He has written three songs for each of the Truckers' records Go-Go Boots and The Big To Do and six songs for their 2014 release English Oceans.

Solo career

In 2013, Cooley released his first solo effort The Fool on Every Corner, a live album recorded at Atlanta's The EARL.

On June 15, 2014, Cooley, Patterson Hood, and Jason Isbell performed at a benefit concert in Florence, Alabama's Shoals Theater. The live acoustic concert was released as an album Mike Cooley Patterson Hood and Jason Isbell Live at the Shoals Theater on November 6, 2020.

Cooley and Hood occasionally perform as an acoustic duo under the moniker, Dimmer Twins.

On May 22, 2021, he performed at a benefit concert in Brookwood, Alabama in support of striking workers during the 2021 Warrior Met Coal strike.

Cooley lives in Hoover, Alabama with his wife and children.

Drive-By Truckers contributions

Discography
Live Albums
The Fool on Every Corner (2013)

Sources

External links
Facebook Page
Live Recording Archive

American rock guitarists
American male guitarists
American rock singers
American rock songwriters
American male singer-songwriters
People from Tuscumbia, Alabama
Living people
1966 births
Drive-By Truckers members
Guitarists from Alabama
20th-century American guitarists
20th-century American male musicians
Singer-songwriters from Alabama